Toninho is a Portuguese diminutive nickname for Antônio or António in use in Portugal, Brazil, South Africa, Namibia, Mozambique and Angola. It is loosely equivalent to Little Tony in English.

Nicknames

Football
Toninho (footballer, born 1947), nickname of Antônio Pedro de Jesus, Brazilian football forward
Toninho (footballer, born 1965), nickname of Antônio Benedito da Silva,  Brazilian footballer
Toninho (footballer, born 1977), nickname of Antônio Bezerra Brandão,  Brazilian footballer
Toninho, nickname of Antônio Dias dos Santos (born 1948), Brazilian footballer (played in 1978 FIFA World Cup)
Toninho Almeida, nickname of Antonio Gonzaga Almeida, (born 1950), Brazilian footballer
Toninho Andrade, nickname of José Antônio Rabelo de Andrade (born 1964), Brazilian footballer and manager
Toninho Cecílio, nickname of Antônio Jorge Cecílio Sobrinho (born 1967), Brazilian footballer and manager
Toninho Cerezo, nickname of Antônio Carlos Cerezo, (born 1955), Brazilian footballer (played in 1978 and 1978 FIFA World Cup)
Toninho dos Santos, nickname of Antonio Teodoro dos Santos (born 1965), Brazilian footballer
 Toninho Guerreiro, nickname of Antônio Ferreira (1942–1990), Brazilian footballer
Toninho Moura, nickname of Antonio Moura Sanches, (born 1954) is a Brazilian footballer and football head coach
Toninho Quintino, nickname of Antônio Fernandes Quintino, (born 1952), Brazilian footballer
Toninho dos Santos (footballer, born 1980), Bissau-Guinean footballer

Other
Toninho, nickname of Antônio da Costa Santos (1952–2001), Brazilian politician
Toninho do Diabo, nickname of Antônio Aparecido Firmino (born ??), Brazilian religious leader
Toninho Horta, nickname of Antônio Maurício Horta de Melo, (born 1948), Brazilian musician
Toninho Wandscheer, nickname of Antonio Wandscheer (born 1950), Brazilian politician

See also
Antônio Carlos Magalhães sometimes known as Toninho Malvaldeza

References